This is a list of municipalities in São Paulo ordered by Human Development Index (HDI) according to data released by the United Nations Development Program (UNDP) of the United Nations for the 2010. The Human Development Index was developed in 1990 by the Pakistani economist Mahbub ul Haq and the Indian economist Amartya Sen.

According to the list. of the 645 municipalities in the state of São Paulo, 24 have very high HDI (equal to or greater than 0.800), 556 have high HDI (between 0.700 and 0.799), 61 have medium (between 0.600 and 0.699), none of them have low (between 0.500 and 0.599), and none of them have very low (less than 0.500). The HDI of São Paulo is 0.819 (considered very high).

Criteria

Categories 
The index varies from 0 to 1, considering:

 Very high – 0.800 to 1.000
 High – 0.700 to 0.799
 Medium – 0.600 to 0.699
 Low – 0.500 to 0.599
 Very low – 0.000 to 0.499

Components 
The HDI of the municipalities is an average between the income index, life expectancy index and educational index.

List

See also 

 Geography of Brazil
 List of cities in Brazil

References 

São Paulo